Fujerd (also Romanized as Fūjerd, Fojird, and Fowjerd) is a village in Dastjerd Rural District, Khalajastan District, Qom County, Qom Province, Iran. At the 2006 census, its population was 291, in 114 families.

References 

Populated places in Qom Province